Miss Malta is a national beauty pageant in Malta which was founded in 1963 by George and Margaret Gatt Mangion of GM Productions. The pageant is also considered as the oldest beauty contest held in the Maltese Islands. During 2014 – 2018, the event was organized by Glamorous Entertainment (Glow Promotions), under the management of Vince Taliana. Since 2019, the pageant has been run under the leadership of Kersten Borg.

The reigning Miss Malta is Kim Pelham of St. Julian's who was crowned on 7 November 2021 at the Radisson Blue hotel of Għajn Tuffieħa.

Titleholders

Notes
2.  In the 2010 – 2020 edition, the runners-up was announced as Miss Republic of Malta and Miss Tourism of Malta
2.  In the 2021 edition, the second to the fifth place was sequentially announced as Miss Republic of Malta, Miss Tourism of Malta, Miss Grand Malta, and Top Model Malta.

International competition
From 1965 to 2001, the winner of Miss Malta represented the country at the Miss World pageant. However, a new organization, Miss World Malta, had instead launched in 2002 to send its delegates to such the international pageant.

See also
 Miss Universe
 Miss International
 Miss Earth

References

External links
missmalta.net

Recurring events established in 1963
Beauty pageants in Malta
Maltese awards
Malta